2007 State Basketball League season may refer to:

2007 MSBL season, Men's SBL season
2007 WSBL season, Women's SBL season